Lardeh is a village in Eram Rural District, Eram District, Dashtestan County, Bushehr Province, Iran. At the 2006 census, its population was 46, in 9 families. Distance as the crow flies between Lardeh and Iran's capital Tehran is approximately 710 km (441 mi.). Distances from Lardeh to the largest places in Iran.

References

Populated places in Dashtestan County